

This is a list of the National Register of Historic Places listings in Humboldt County, California.

This is intended to be a complete list of the properties and districts on the National Register of Historic Places in Humboldt County, California, United States. Latitude and longitude coordinates are provided for many National Register properties and districts; these locations may be seen together in an online map.

There are 55 properties and districts listed on the National Register in the county, including 1 National Historic Landmark.

Current listings

|}

See also

List of National Historic Landmarks in California
National Register of Historic Places listings in California
California Historical Landmarks in Humboldt County, California

References

Humboldt